Chopin is a crater on Mercury. It has a diameter of 131 kilometers. Chopin is named for the Polish composer Frédéric Chopin (lived 1810–49). Its name was adopted by the International Astronomical Union in 1976.

References

Links
 
 Maps of the region with current names of surface features: northern part, southern part

Impact craters on Mercury
Monuments and memorials to Frédéric Chopin